The Rhône Glacier (Walliser German: Rottengletscher) is a glacier in the Swiss Alps and the source of the river Rhône and one of the primary contributors to Lake Geneva in the far eastern end of the Swiss canton of Valais. Because the glacier is located close to the Furka Pass road it is easily accessible.

Geography
The Rhône Glacier is the largest glacier in the Urner Alps. It lies on the south side of the range at the source of the Rhône. The Undri Triftlimi (3,081 m) connects it to the Trift Glacier. The glacier is located on the northernmost part of the canton of Valais, between the Grimsel Pass and the Furka Pass and is part of the Oberwald municipality. The Dammastock (3,630 m) is the highest summit above the glacier.

Evolution

The Rhône Glacier is easily accessible so its evolution is observed since the 19th century. The glacier lost ~1300 m during the last 120 years leaving behind a track of naked stone.

Slowing the retreat

For several years, UV-resistant fleecy white blankets have been installed during the warm periods, covering about 5 acres of the retreating glacier to reduce its melting. It's estimated that this effort reduces the melting by up to 70%. In addition to the global implications of increasing climate warming and instability, the local economy is at risk of losing business income from glacier tourists who have flocked to the area since 1870 to walk through "a long and winding ice grotto with glistening blue walls and a leaky ceiling". In 2018, photographers Simon Norfolk and Klaus Thymann created a series of photographs titled "Shroud" displaying the wrapped glacier for the charity organisation Project Pressure to draw attention to the glacial retreat.

See also
List of glaciers in Switzerland
List of glaciers
Retreat of glaciers since 1850
Swiss Alps

References 

 Rhône Glacier at Glaciers online
 Rhône Glacier at NASA Earth Observatory

External links
Simulation of the shrinking of the glacier
Swiss Glacier Monitoring Network: Rhône Glacier - with length variation measurements since 1879

Interactive repeat photo comparisons of the Rhône Glacier

Glaciers of Valais
Glaciers of the Alps
Rhône
Tourist attractions in Valais